is a Japanese comedian, tarento and actor who has featured in films, television, and radio. He performs boke and writes all the material in his comedy duo Kirin. His partner is Hiroshi Tamura. Kawashima is represented by Yoshimoto Kogyo and is mainly active in Tokyo and Osaka.

Life and career
Kawashima graduated from the 20th generation Yoshimoto NSC Osaka. He formed the comedy duo Kirin with Hiroshi Tamura in 1999 and rose to popularity after becoming a finalist in the 1st M-1 Grand Prix in 2001. Kirin continued to make strides as they entered the finals 5 out of the 8 times they entered the M-1 Grand Prix, becoming active in manzai despite their initial focus on the genre of conte. In 2010, Kawashima entered the R-1 Grand Prix and was a finalist, finishing in 4th place overall.

Kawashima was engaged in 2015 and married on March 8, 2016. Later that year in November 2016, Kawashima won his first oogiri winning title on Ippon Grand Prix, defeating the then three-time champion Bakarhythm. From then on, Kawashima was a regular on Ippon Grand Prix, almost winning his second and back to back title against Chihara Junior in May 2017, but lost as the runners-up.  Kawashima continues to perform as a television personality.

Media 
This list consists of only media appearances and works by Akira Kawashima, for appearances and works as the comedy duo Kirin, see Kirin.

Movies
  (SSM Co Ltd, 2007-02-03)
  (Jolly Roger, 2009-06-20)
  (SSM Co Ltd, 2009-07-25) – Voice-over dub
  (2013-10-19) – as Takuya Hirahara
  (Toei, 2017-03-25) – as MC, voice-over dub

Television

Dramas
  – Chapter 3, Koisuru Konbini (Nippon TV, 2008-03-15) as Imaizumi's boyfriend
  (NHK G)
 (2009) – as Bekkamu Ichirō
 (2019) – as Katsumi Shimoyama
  (TBS, 2019-01-16) – as Yasuda

Current Programs

Regular
 Keiba Beat (Kansai TV, 2010-01-10–) – MC
  (TV Tokyo, 2014-10-08–)
  (Fuji TV, 2015-04-13–)
  (Kansai TV, 2016-04-08) – MC

Special/Irregular
  (Chukyo TV, 2011–) – Annually
  (ABC TV, 2012–) – MC, Special Program
  (MBS TV, 2012–) – Special Program
  (Nippon TV, 2015–) – Senpai no Kabe, Special Program
  (Fuji TV, 2016–) – Special Program, Irregular
  (TV Asahi, 2007–) – Irregular

Radio
  (NHK Radio 1, 2014-04-03–) – Thursday Personality
  (NHK Radio 1, 2012–) – MC, Special Program
  (NHK Radio 1) – Special Program

Web series
  (AbemaTV, 2018-11-04–) – MC

Commercials
  (Shiseido, 2006)
  (Shiseido, 2006)
 Garlic Pepper Chicken (KFC Japan, 2007)
 Monster Hunter Freedom Unite (Sony Interactive Entertainment, 2008)
 Fire Emblem: New Mystery of the Emblem (Nintendo, 2010) – alongside Riisa Naka
 Pilotwings Resort (Nintendo, 2011)
 Monster Hunter 4 (Nintendo, 2013)
 Suzuki Wagon R (Suzuki)

DVD
  (Yoshimoto Kogyo, 2010-07-21)

Bibliography
 (Futabasha, 2014-11-05)

References

External links

Japanese comedians
Japanese television personalities
Japanese male actors
People from Kyoto
1979 births
Living people